Clubul Sportiv Mioveni, commonly known as CS Mioveni or simply Mioveni, is a Romanian professional football club based in Mioveni, Argeș County, which competes in the Liga I.

The team was founded in 2000 as AS Mioveni and began playing the fourth division. The following year, it merged with nearby Dacia Pitești and took its berth in the Divizia C. The club made its first appearance in the top division in the 2007–08 campaign as Dacia Mioveni, and in 2010 settled on the current name of CS Mioveni.

"The Yellow and Greens" play their home matches at the Stadionul Orășenesc, which has a seating capacity of 10,000 persons.

History

First years and ascension (2000–2011)
The club was founded in 2000 under the name AS Mioveni (Mioveni Sports Association). After one season in the Liga IV, AS Mioveni merged with Dacia Pitești in 2001 and took its place in the Liga III, while the club changed its name to AS Dacia Mioveni, only to change it soon after that to CS Dacia Mioveni (Dacia Mioveni Sports Club).

In its first season of division football, Dacia finished 3rd in the Liga III. The next season however, the team finished top of series IV of the Liga III and therefore, in the summer of 2003 they promoted to the Liga II where they activated for four years without any outstanding performance.

At the end of the 2006–07 season, Dacia Mioveni finished runner-up in the Liga II, Seria II, and promoted for the first time in history to the Liga I.

Dacia's best performance was the only appearance in the Liga I, in the 2007–08 season, when they finished 16th and were relegated. During the same season Dacia Mioveni reached the semi-finals of the Cupa României, being eliminated by CFR Cluj, after an impressive win in the quarterfinals against Dinamo București, with 1–0.

In the summer of 2010 the club was renamed, CS Mioveni being the new name. The club officials took this decision because Automobile Dacia refused to sponsor the club, instead sponsoring Italian club Udinese Calcio.

Even if the club had finished the 2010-11 Liga II season on the third position, the club promoted in the Liga I because the second placed FC Bihor Oradea had problems with the licence.

A second league constant and a new promotion (2011–present)
CS Mioveni relegated again in the Liga II at the end of the 2011–12 edition, after finishing on the bottom of the league, with only 12 points won in 34 rounds. After this season, "the yellow and greens" spent no less than 9 years in the antechamber of the Romanian top-flight, the team from Automobile Dacia's town becoming a classic of the Liga II. Most of the time, Mioveni was too good to relegate in the third tier, but not good enough to promote back in the first division. In these nine years, the club obtain the following rankings: 2nd (2014–15), 3rd (2019–20), 4th (2015–16, 2016–17), 7th (2018–19), 8th (2012–13, 2013–14) and 9th (2017–18).

Mioveni promoted back to the Liga I at the end of the 2020–21 season, when after a ranking on the 3rd place, they won the promotion/relegation play-offs (2–1 on aggregate) against top-flight club FC Hermannstadt.

Ground

CS Mioveni plays its home games on Stadionul Orășenesc, a 10,000-seat arena, in downtown Mioveni. Between 2013 and 2015 the stadium was renovated and "the yellow and greens" played their home matches on Nicolae Dobrin Stadium in Pitești. Second team of the club, CS Mioveni II, also used to play its home matches on Colibași Stadium, stadium used also by the first team as a training ground.

Support
CS Mioveni has never had many supporters in Argeș County, most of the public opting for much more familiar and successful FC Argeș. Over the time the club had sporadically an organized group of supporters, especially between 2006 and 2011, when the club was in the Liga I, twice and important rivalries with FC Argeș were born.

Rivalries
CS Mioveni does not have many important rivalries, the only important one is against FC Argeș Pitești, commonly known as Argeș Derby or the Derby of Argeș. In the past, Mioveni had also a local rivalry against Internațional Curtea de Argeș.

Honours

Domestic

Leagues
Liga II
Runners-up (2): 2006–07, 2014–15
Play-off Winners (1): 2020–21
Liga III
Winners (1): 2002–03

Other performances
Appearances in Liga I: 3
Best finish in Liga I: 12th in 2021–22
Place 75 of 101 teams in Liga I All-time table
Semi-finalist of 2007–08 Cupa României

Players

First team squad

Out on loan

Club officials

Board of directors

 Last updated: 18 January 2023
 Source:

Current technical staff

 Last updated: 18 January 2023
 Source:

Notable former players
The footballers enlisted below have had international cap(s) for their respective countries at junior and/or senior level and/or more than 100 caps for CS Mioveni.

Romania

  Ilie Baicu
  Valentin Balint
  Constantin Barbu
  Ciprian Biceanu
  Nicolae Dică
  Gabriel Enache
  Eduard Florescu
  Claudiu Ionescu
  Laurențiu Marinescu
  Andrei Mărgăritescu
  Cosmin Năstăsie
  Adrian Neaga
  Robert Neagoe
  Andrei Nilă
  Dan Nistor
  Dorinel Oancea
  Mihai Olteanu
  Octavian Popescu
  Cristian Tănase
Brazil
  Roberto Ayza
Central African Republic
    Ali Calvin Tolmbaye

Notable former managers

  Constantin Cârstea
  Sorin Cârțu
  Iordan Eftimie
  Florin Halagian
  Florin Marin
  Ion Moldovan
  Claudiu Niculescu
  Marian Pană
  Alexandru Pelici
  Ionuț Popa
  Laurențiu Roșu
  Ilie Stan
  Flavius Stoican
  Mihai Stoichiță

League history

References

External links
Official website
Club profile on UEFA's official website

 
Association football clubs established in 2000
Football clubs in Argeș County
Liga I clubs
Liga II clubs
Liga III clubs
2000 establishments in Romania